The Joseph A. Sellinger, S.J. School of Business and Management is the business school of Loyola University Maryland  (formerly Loyola College in Maryland) and is located on the college's main campus in Baltimore, Maryland. Formally established in 1980, the business school was named in honor of Loyola's late president Reverend Joseph A. Sellinger, S.J., although the university has been offering courses in business for over 70 years. The Sellinger School consists of seven academic departments: Accounting, Economics, Finance, Information Systems/ Operations Management, Management/ International Business, Marketing, and Law & Social Responsibility. The Sellinger School of Business and Management is one of Loyola's three schools, the other two being the College of Arts and Sciences and the College of Education.

Timeline

Loyola College first offered courses in accounting and business administration at the undergraduate level in 1937. The baccalaureate degree in business administration was first awarded in 1943 with the accounting major added shortly thereafter. Loyola introduced the Executive MBA program in 1973, the first of its kind in the Baltimore-Washington area and one of the first ten Executive MBA programs in the country. Loyola established the School of Business and Management in 1980 to provide strategic management for business programs. In 1984, the business school was formally named The Joseph A. Sellinger, S.J. School of Business and Management in honor of the late Reverend Joseph A. Sellinger. In 1985, the Sellinger School initiated the Fellows MBA program to serve rising young executives. In 1988, the Sellinger School earned accreditation in all programs by AACSB (The International Association for Management Education). In early 2000, the Sellinger School moved into a new state-of-the-art facility constructed on the north side of the academic quadrangle.

Jesuit Education

Loyola University Maryland is a Jesuit Catholic university committed to the educational and spiritual traditions of the Society of Jesus and to the ideals of liberal education and the development of the whole person. Accordingly, the College will inspire students to learn, lead and serve in a diverse and changing world.

In this mission the hallmarks of a Jesuit education are clearly evident: a commitment to the rich tradition of Catholic education, an emphasis on academic excellence, the importance of the liberal arts, and the education of the whole person. At Loyola, this means that the curriculum is rigorous and faculty expectations are high. All undergraduates complete the core curriculum that includes courses in English, philosophy, theology, ethics, history, fine arts, foreign language, mathematics, science, and social sciences. Students are challenged to understand the ethical dimensions of personal and professional life and to examine their own values, attitudes, and beliefs. The College sponsors a variety of programs and opportunities in support of its Jesuit mission; these include the Center for Values and Service, Campus Ministry, and Catholic Studies.

Academics
The Sellinger School stresses the importance of Experiential Learning, noting that such opportunity serves to enhance traditional classroom work through the integration of theory and practice. Students are offered the chance for enriched academic discussion and a broadened learning environment through Internship, Study Abroad, and Service-Learning Experiences. Two of the three are required for graduation from the Sellinger School.

The college recognizes chapters of Beta Gamma Sigma and Beta Alpha Psi, and affords students international societies such as the Financial Management Association for academic growth and development. The Sellinger Scholars business honors program was developed to prepare highly motivated students for roles of leadership and service in a diverse and changing world. Students are invited to join in their Freshmen year based on academic achievement and must then go through an interview process.

Awards and Distinctions

Loyola's Sellinger School of Business and Management is the only Baltimore MBA program that has earned accolades from some of the country's most prestigious business publications:
Sellinger ranked number 45 in the nation in Business Week's 2010 ranking of Best Undergraduate Business Schools.
U.S. News & World Report named Loyola College in Maryland the Number Two master’s university in the North region in its 2009 “America’s Best Colleges” survey.
The Sellinger School is ranked number 45 in BusinessWeek magazine’s third annual “Best Undergrad B-Schools” survey. More than 125 schools were eligible for inclusion in the rankings.
U.S. News & World Report ranks Loyola as one of the nation’s top 35 best part-time MBA programs. 
Business Week named Loyola among the world’s 20 largest providers of part-time graduate business education for full-time professionals. 
The Health Finance Report ranked Loyola’s Executive MBA program as one of the top five programs for physicians. 
AACSB Accredited in both Business and Accounting – fewer than 10% of schools nationwide hold dual accreditation through AACSB.
Business Week ranked several of its undergraduate business specialties in 2012: Economics 8th, Business Law 10th, Ethics 12th, Marketing 15th, International Business 28th, and Information Systems 3rd.

Facility
The Joseph A. Sellinger, S.J., School of Business and Management Building opened its doors in January 2000. The 50,000-square-foot (4,600 m²) facility features innovative learning space and faculty offices; a five-story glass façade; an open atrium; 11 state-of-the-art classrooms; a four-story glass tower; and three seminar rooms. The building resides on the northwest side of the academic quadrangle, neighboring Maryland Hall.

Notable alumni 

Harry Markopolos, chief investment officer of Rampart Investment Management Co. and early whistleblower of Bernard Madoff

References

Business schools in Maryland
Loyola University Maryland
Loyola University Maryland Sellinger